Sebastián Villa Castañeda (born 21 February 1992) is a Colombian diver. He competed for Colombia at the 2012 Summer Olympics.

He has qualified to represent Colombia at the 2020 Summer Olympics.

References

External links
 
 

1992 births
Living people
Colombian male divers
Olympic divers of Colombia
Divers at the 2012 Summer Olympics
Divers at the 2016 Summer Olympics
Pan American Games bronze medalists for Colombia
Pan American Games medalists in diving
Divers at the 2011 Pan American Games
Divers at the 2015 Pan American Games
South American Games silver medalists for Colombia
South American Games medalists in diving
Competitors at the 2014 South American Games
Divers at the 2019 Pan American Games
Medalists at the 2011 Pan American Games
Divers at the 2020 Summer Olympics
21st-century Colombian people